This incomplete list of characters from the Star Wars franchise contains only those which are considered part of the official Star Wars canon, as of the changes made by Lucasfilm in April 2014. Following its acquisition by The Walt Disney Company in 2012, Lucasfilm rebranded most of the novels, comics, video games and other works produced since the originating 1977 film Star Wars as Star Wars Legends and declared them non-canon to the rest of the franchise. As such, the list contains only information from the Skywalker Saga films, the 2008 animated TV series Star Wars: The Clone Wars, and other films, shows, or video games published or produced after April 2014.

The list includes humans and various alien species. No droid characters are included; for those, see the list of Star Wars droid characters. Some of the characters featured in this list have additional or alternate plotlines in the non-canonical Legends continuity. To see those or characters who do not exist at all in the current Star Wars canon, see the list of Star Wars Legends characters and list of Star Wars: Knights of the Old Republic characters.

A

Gial Ackbar

Stass Allie 
Stass Allie is a Tholothian Jedi Master and the cousin of Adi Gallia. She takes Gallia's spot on the Jedi Council after her death at the hands of Savage Opress during the Clone Wars. Allie is one of the many victims of Order 66.

The character has been portrayed by Lily Nyamwasa in Episode III.

Almec 
Almec is a Mandalorian politician who serves as Prime Minister of Mandalore during the Clone Wars. A prominent supporter of Satine Kryze and her New Mandalorian government, he is imprisoned for his involvement in an illegal smuggling ring but is later freed and reinstated as a puppet leader after Darth Maul takes over the New Mandalorian capital city of Sundari. When Maul is later captured by Darth Sidious, Almec sends Mandalorian super commandos Gar Saxon and Rook Kast to rescue him. During the Siege of Mandalore, he is captured by Bo-Katan Kryze's force and is killed by Saxon when he attempts to relay information to Ahsoka, Rex, and Bo-Katan.

The character has been voiced by Julian Holloway in The Clone Wars.

Mas Amedda 
Mas Amedda is the Chagrian Vice Chair of the Galactic Senate. He is Grand Vizier and head of the Imperial Ruling Council, installed by Gallius Rax as the puppet leader of the Empire following Palpatine's death. Amedda formally surrenders the Empire to the New Republic.

The character has been portrayed by Jerome Blake and David Bowers in Episodes I-III, and voiced by Stephen Stanton in The Clone Wars and The Bad Batch. His story has also been expanded in Aftermath: Life Debt and Aftermath: Empire's End

Padmé Amidala

Cassian Andor

The Armorer

Colton Raymus Antilles 
Colton Raymus Antilles is captain of the CR90 corvette Tantive IV, where he is strangled to death by Darth Vader. Antilles was also the last master of C-3PO and R2-D2 before they fall under the ownership of Luke Skywalker. In the final days of the Republic, Antilles served as captain of the CR70 corvette Tantive III.

The character has been portrayed by Peter Geddis in Episode IV, by Rohan Nichol in Episode III, and by Tim Beckmann in Rogue One.

Wedge Antilles

Ryder Azadi 
Ryder Azadi is the former Governor of Lothal and a family friend to Ephraim and Mira Bridger. He secretly assisted them in their campaign against the Galactic Empire which led to their arrest. Ryder escaped prison, but his friends did not. He later met Ezra and Kanan on Lothal. After helping in a mission that also involved Princess Leia, Ryder decided to form a new Rebel cell on Lothal. He later pretends to betray the Rebels in order to lure Governor Pryce into a trap. During the final part of the battle, Ryder tries to get Pryce to come along quietly when the Imperial base begins to take off and explode to no avail, but Pryce chooses to die, staying loyal to the Empire until the end. His status and whereabouts after the liberation of Lothal are currently unknown, but since there was no Imperial retaliation it can be assumed that he assisted in the reconstruction of Lothal and possibly once again assumed the governorship.

The character has been voiced by Clancy Brown in Rebels.

Azmorigan 
Azmorigan is a Jablogian crime lord and business partner of Vizago's. He was first tricked by Lando Calrissian into giving the entrepreneur a mining-purposed puffer pig and trading it for Hera, who then outsmarted Azmorigan and escaped from his ship, the Merchant One, to Calrissian and the Ghost crew. Azmorigan cornered them at Vizago's mining estate, intending to reclaim the puffer pig and Hera along the Ghost and its crew but was defeated there and is forced to flee. In The Wynkahthu Job, having formed an alliance with Hondo, with the two of them attacking an Imperial cargo ship only to have it become caught in the storms of a nearby planet, forcing them to call upon the Ghost crew for help. The salvage operation gets the rebels several proton bombs and an encounter with Imperial Sentry Droids, while Hondo only succeeds in unintentionally recovering one of his Ugnaughts.

The character has been voiced by James Hong in Rebels.

B

Ponda Baba 
Ponda Baba is an Aqualish mercenary who attacks Luke Skywalker in the Mos Eisley cantina, and then gets his arm cut off by Obi-Wan Kenobi's lightsaber. He is an associate of Dr. Cornelius Evazan, who also antagonizes Luke Skywalker in the cantina. When the original Kenner action figure for Baba was released, the then-unnamed alien was called simply "Walrus Man".

In Episode IV the character was portrayed by Tommy Isley.  In Rogue One, he is seen with Dr. Evazan on the streets of Jedha.

Cad Bane

Darth Bane

Tobias Beckett

Val Beckett 
Val Beckett is the wife and partner-in-crime of Tobias Beckett. She is killed during a failed Coaxium heist for the Crimson Dawn.

The character has been portrayed by Thandiwe Newton in Solo.

The Bendu 
The Bendu is an ancient Force-wielder whose philosophy predates the Jedi Order; encountered by the rebels on the planet Atollon, where he describes himself as being "the middle" between the ashla, light-wielding Jedi, and the bogan, dark-wielding Sith.

The character has been voiced by Tom Baker in Rebels.

Sio Bibble 
Sio Bibble is the Governor of Naboo.

The character has been portrayed by Oliver Ford Davies in Episodes I-III.

Depa Billaba 
Depa Billaba is a Jedi Master on the Jedi High Council who falls into a six-month coma after an encounter with General Grievous on Haruun Kal. While recovering, she forms a bond with Padawan Caleb Dume (who will later become known as Kanan Jarrus), whom she takes on as her apprentice. She sacrifices herself during Order 66 to save her Padawan.

The character has been portrayed by Dipika O'Neill Joti in Episodes I-II, and voiced by Archie Panjabi in The Bad Batch.

Jar Jar Binks

Zorii Bliss 
Zorri Bliss is a leader of a group of spice-smugglers from the planet Kijimi and a past love interest of Resistance pilot Poe Dameron. She later was among the many who assisted the Resistance in the air battle against the Sith Eternal forces over Exegol.

The character has been portrayed by Keri Russell in Episode IX.

Lux Bonteri 
Lux Bonteri is son of Separatist senator Mina Bonteri, and freedom fighter during the Clone Wars; love interest of Ahsoka Tano. After his mother's assassination, he becomes the representative of his homeworld Onderonn in the Galactic Senate.

The character has been voiced by Jason Spisak in The Clone Wars.

Bossk 
Bossk is a notorious Trandoshan bounty hunter who is one of the six summoned by Darth Vader to find the Millennium Falcon. He is also seen in Jabba's Palace. Bossk is the son of bounty hunter Cradossk and is known for his hatred and hunting of Wookiees, with a particular vendetta against the Wookiee Chewbacca. During the Clone Wars, he mentors and serves as a bodyguard to a young Boba Fett, eventually joining his syndicate of bounty hunters.

The character has been portrayed by Alan Harris in Episodes V-VI, and voiced by Dee Bradley Baker in The Clone Wars.

Ezra Bridger

C

Bix Caleen 
Bix Caleen is a mechanic and black market dealer who is Andor's ally.

The character has been portrayed by Adria Arjona in Andor.

Lando Calrissian

Chewbacca

Cid 
Cid is a former Jedi informant who provides the Bad Batch with mercenary missions in the aftermath of the Clone Wars.

The character has been voiced by Rhea Perlman in The Bad Batch.

The Client

Rush Clovis 
Rush Clovis is a Separatist Senator who represents the planet Scipio in the Galactic Senate, as well as a former love interest of Padmé Amidala. When the Clone Wars break out, he becomes a delegate of the InterGalactic Banking Clan. During the Battle of Scipio, he sacrifices himself to save Padmé.

The character has been voiced by Robin Atkin Downes in The Clone Wars.

Commander CC-2224 "Cody" 
CC-2224, or "Cody", is a clone Commander of the 212th Attack Battalion, serving under Obi-Wan Kenobi during the Clone Wars. Following the Battle of Utapau, he unwillingly betrays and attempts to kill Kenobi when Order 66 is issued.

The character has been portrayed by Temuera Morrison in Episode III, and voiced by Dee Bradley Baker in The Clone Wars and The Bad Batch.

Kaydel Ko Connix 
Kaydel Ko Connix is a junior controller in the Resistance during the sequel trilogy. 

The character has been portrayed by Billie Lourd, daughter of Carrie Fisher, in Episodes VII-IX.

Eno Cordova 
Eno Cordova is a Jedi Master, presumed survivor of Order 66, and former mentor of Cere Junda and owner of BD-1. He discovered an ancient vault built by the Force-sensitive Zeffo on the planet Bogano, where he hid a Jedi Holocron containing a list of Force-sensitive children, in the hopes that it could someday help rebuild the Jedi Order.

The character has been voiced by Tony Amendola in Jedi: Fallen Order.

CT-9904 "Crosshair" 
CT-9904, or "Crosshair", is a deformed clone trooper and member of Clone Force 99. He is the team's sniper, possessing genetic mutations that give him exceptional eyesight. He is the only member of Clone Force 99 whose biochip is activated when Order 66 is issued, causing him to turn on his squadmates after they rebel against the newly formed Galactic Empire. Crosshair is later put in charge of a unit of conscripted Imperial soldiers, and tasked with hunting down the Bad Batch. Though he eventually learns about his biochip and removes it, he continues to willingly serve the Empire, believing that attempting to fight it is useless and holding a grudge against the Bad Batch for abandoning him. After being forced to work with the Bad Batch to survive Tipoca City's destruction, Crosshair partially makes amends with his former squadmates, but still refuses to join them.

The character has been voiced by Dee Bradley Baker in The Clone Wars and The Bad Batch.

Salacious B. Crumb 
Salacious B. Crumb is a Kowakian monkey-lizard in Jabba the Hutt's court.

The character has been performed by Tim Rose in Episode VI, with his voice provided by Mark Dodson. Rose's antics controlling the Crumb puppet led to an increase in the character's prominence.

D

Figrin D'an 
Figrin D'an is the leader of the Bith band "Figrin D'an and the Modal Nodes", playing in the Mos Eisley cantina.

The character has been portrayed by Rick Baker in Episode IV.

Poe Dameron

Biggs Darklighter 
Biggs Darklighter is a pilot for the Rebel Alliance, and a childhood friend of Luke Skywalker. In the Battle of Yavin, Darklighter was shot down and killed by Darth Vader.

The character has been portrayed by Garrick Hagon in Episode IV.

The Daughter 
One of the Mortis gods, the Daughter is the embodiment of the light side of the Force, child of the Father, and sister to the Son. She is obedient of her father and helps him test Anakin Skywalker to see whether he is the Chosen One and can replace the Father. She ultimately sacrifices herself to save her father from her brother and manages to also save Ahsoka Tano, who had been corrupted by the latter, before dying. She is believed to have been reincarnated as Morai, an owl who is seen accompanying Ahsoka several times and to whom she claims she owes her life.

The character has been voiced by Adrienne Wilkinson in The Clone Wars.

Mee Deechi 
Mee Deechi is an Umbaran Senator whose assassination prompts the Umbaran people to side with the Confederacy of Independent Systems in the Clone Wars.

The character has been voiced by Gideon Emery in The Clone Wars.

Dengar 
Dengar is a Corellian bounty hunter summoned by Darth Vader to hunt for the Millennium Falcon, and he is also briefly visible later in Jabba's Palace. During the Clone Wars, Dengar is part of a syndicate of bounty hunters betrayed by Asajj Ventress on the planet Quarzite.

The character has been portrayed by Morris Bush in Episodes V-VI, and voiced by Simon Pegg in The Clone Wars.

Dengar attempts to capture Han Solo and Chewbacca in the 2015 Star Wars Marvel comics series story-line "Showdown on the Smuggler's Moon" and makes appearances in the Star Wars: Darth Vader comic series as well. In the Aftermath novels, Dengar both battles and befriends fellow bounty hunter Mercurial Swift, before joining Jas Emari to rescue Norra Wexley during the Battle of Jakku, and receives a pardon from the New Republic.

DJ 
DJ is a slicer who assists and then betrays Finn and Rose Tico on their mission aboard the First Order flagship, the Mega-class Star Dreadnought Supremacy.

The character has been portrayed by Benicio del Toro in Episode VIII.

Din Djarin / The Mandalorian

Tan Divo 
Tan Divo is a Coruscant police inspector during the Clone Wars, often displaying a pompous attitude. After the end of the Clone Wars, Divo lived on Alderaan and died when the first Death Star blew up the planet in an event known as "The Disaster."

The character has been voiced by Tom Kenny in The Clone Wars.

Lott Dod 
Lott Dod is a Neimoidian senator of the Trade Federation, representing the trade conglomerate's interests in the Galactic Senate.

The character has been portrayed by Silas Carson in Episode I (voiced by Toby Longworth), and voiced by Gideon Emery in The Clone Wars.

Jan Dodonna 
Jan Dodonna is a general and leader of the Rebel base on Yavin 4 who plans the attack on the first Death Star.

The character has been portrayed by Alex McCrindle in Episode IV, voiced by Michael Bell in Rebels, and portrayed by Ian McElhinney in Rogue One. In Episode IV, he is also the first character to utter the phrase, "May the Force be with you".

Count Dooku / Darth Tyranus

Dormé 
Dormé is a Handmaiden for Padmé Amidala. After a failed attempt on Amidala's life, Dormé ran into her room to check on Amidala.

The character has been portrayed by Rose Byrne in Episode II.

Cin Drallig 
Cin Drallig is a Jedi Master who serves as the battlemaster and head of security for the Jedi Temple in the final days of the Clone Wars. He is killed by Darth Vader during the siege of the temple in Revenge of the Sith.

The character has been portrayed by Nick Gillard in Episode III, and voiced by Robin Atkin Downes in The Clone Wars.

Garven Dreis 
Garven Dreis is leader of Red Squadron during the attack on the first Death Star in the Battle of Yavin, where he is shot down and killed by Darth Vader.

The character has been portrayed by Drewe Henley in Episode IV. Unused footage of actor Drewe Henley as Garven Dreis from A New Hope was also used during the Battle of Scarif in Rogue One.

Caleb Dume / Kanan Jarrus

Cara Dune

Rio Durant 
Rio Durant is an Ardennian pilot and long-time associate of criminals Tobias and Val Beckett. He is killed during a failed Coaxium heist for the Crimson Dawn.

The character has been voiced by Jon Favreau in Solo.

Tala Durith 
Tala Durith is a disillusioned Imperial officer on Mapuzo who aids Ben Kenobi and Princess Leia via The Path.

The character has been portrayed by Indira Varma in Obi-Wan Kenobi.

E

CT-1409 "Echo" 
CT-1409, or "Echo", is an ARC Trooper and member of Domino Squad and the 501st Legion, who is seemingly killed in the Battle of Lola Sayu. In reality, however, he was captured and used against his will as a pawn by the Separatists for their campaign on Anaxes. After being rescued by Captain Rex and the Bad Batch, he plays a key role in leading the Republic to victory in the battle of Anaxes, before joining Clone Force 99 as its latest member. Following Order 66, Echo along with most of the team rebel against the Empire and become mercenaries.

The character has been voiced by Dee Bradley Baker in The Clone Wars and The Bad Batch.

The Eighth Brother 
The Eighth Brother is a masked Terellian Jango Jumper who trailed the former Sith Lord Darth Maul to the planet Malachor, before falling to his death attempting to flee from the combined might of Maul, Kanan Jarrus, and Ahsoka Tano.

The character has been voiced by Robbie Daymond in Rebels.

Morgan Elsbeth 
Morgan Elsbeth is a former protégé of Grand Admiral Thrawn who leads a small Imperial Remnant on the planet Corvus. She is targeted by Ahsoka Tano, who eventually defeats her and liberates the town of Calodan with the Mandalorian's help, before interrogating her for Thrawn's whereabouts.

The character has been portrayed by Diana Lee Inosanto in The Mandalorian.

Embo 
Embo is a Kyuzo bounty hunter that works for the highest bidder, but has a sense of honor. His weapons include a bowcaster and his hat, which he uses as both a boomerang and board.

The character has been voiced by Dave Filoni in The Clone Wars.

Galen Erso 
Galen Erso is an Imperial research scientist and the father of Jyn Erso. As prime designer of the Death Star, Erso supplies information on a critical weakness to the Rebellion, allowing an attack on the seemingly invulnerable battle station. Despite this, he is later mortally wounded by the Rebels in an attack on an Imperial base on Eadu, and gets to briefly reunite with his daughter before dying.

The character has been portrayed by Mads Mikkelsen in Rogue One.

Jyn Erso

Cornelius Evazan 
Dr. Cornelius Evazan is a character who antagonizes Luke Skywalker and is subsequently attacked with a lightsaber by Obi-Wan Kenobi in the Mos Eisley cantina. He is a human male with a heavily scarred face, accompanied by his Aqualish associate Ponda Baba. He claims to be a wanted man who has the death sentence on 12 systems. Evazan also bumps into Jyn Erso and threatens her on the streets of Jedha in Rogue One.

The character has been portrayed by Alfie Curtis in Episode IV, and by Michael Smiley in Rogue One.

F

Onaconda Farr 
Onaconda Farr is a senator from Rodia initially aligned with the CIS, before eventually returning to the Republic thanks to his old friend and fellow Senator Padmé Amidala. He is later killed with a poisoned drink by his personal aide, Lolo Purs, who held him responsible for bringing the war to Rodia.

The character has been portrayed by Zuraya Hamilton in Episode II, and voiced by Dee Bradley Baker in The Clone Wars.

The Father 
One of the three Mortis gods, the Father represents the balance of the Force, between his Daughter, who embodies the light side of the Force, and his Son, who embodies the dark side. After growing old, he lures Anakin Skywalker, Obi-Wan Kenobi, and Ahsoka Tano to Mortis in order to test the former and see if he is indeed the "Chosen One" and will bring balance to the Force. He eventually becomes convinced of this, but Anakin refuses his offer to stay on Mortis and become his successor. The Father later commits suicide, which renders the Son mortal and allows Anakin to kill him for all the harm he had done.

The character has been voiced by Lloyd Sherr in The Clone Wars.

Boba Fett

Jango Fett

The Fifth Brother 
The Fifth Brother is the second Inquisitor introduced in Rebels. A gray-skinned humanoid, he and the Seventh Sister are dispatched to hunt down the crew of the Ghost after the death of the Grand Inquisitor. They are both ultimately killed by Maul on Malachor.

The character has been voiced by Philip Anthony-Rodriguez in Rebels, and portrayed by Sung Kang in Obi-Wan Kenobi.

Finn / FN-2187

Kit Fisto 
Kit Fisto is a Nautolan Jedi Master and member of the Jedi Council. He dies when attempting to arrest Darth Sidious in Revenge of the Sith.

The character has been portrayed by Zachariah Jensen and Daniel Zizmor in Episode II, by Ben Cooke in Episode III, and voiced by Phil LaMarr in The Clone Wars. Fisto was first developed as a male Sith concept by concept artist Dermot Power. When the alien Sith apprentice idea was abandoned, Power revisited the tentacle-headed alien as a Jedi, with a less malevolent face, yet still with an imposing presence.

CT-27-5555 "Fives" 
CT-27-5555, or "Fives", is an ARC Trooper and member of the Domino Squad and the 501st Legion, who participates in numerous battles of the Clone Wars. After witnessing his close friend Clone Trooper Tup unwittingly executing Jedi General Tiplar during the Battle of Ringo Vinda, Fives goes to great lengths to find answers for Tup's actions, ultimately leading to his discovery of Order 66. However, because of this, Palpatine frames him for an assassination attempt. Before he could reveal what he learned to Captain Rex and Anakin Skywalker, Fives is killed by Commander Fox under Palpatine's orders.

The character has been voiced by Dee Bradley Baker in The Clone Wars.

Bib Fortuna

Babu Frik 
Babu Frik is an Anzellan droidsmith on Kijimi who helps Rey, Finn and Poe Dameron decrypt a message inside C-3PO's memory. He later survives the Sith Eternal's destruction of Kijimi and is present at the Battle of Exegol.

The character has been voiced by Shirley Henderson in Episode IX. Henderson later voiced other Anzellan droidsmiths in season 3 of The Mandalorian.

Garsa Fwip

G

Adi Gallia 
Adi Gallia is a Tholothian Jedi Master and member of the Jedi Council. Gallia is killed by Savage Oppress during the Clone Wars. She also appears as a disembodied voice empowering Rey to face the rejuvenated Darth Sidious.

The character has been portrayed by Gin Clarke in Episode I, and voiced by Angelique Perrin in The Clone Wars and Episode IX.

Garindan 
Garindan is a Kubaz spy who leads Imperial stormtroopers to the Millennium Falcon. 

The character has appeared in Episode IV. The character is the focus of the short story "The Secrets of Long Snoot" in the anthology book From a Certain Point of View, which reveals his full name to be Garindan ezz Zavor and that he was a slave of the Empire.

Saw Gerrera

Steela Gerrera 
Steela Gerrera is the sister of Saw Gerrera, who was part of his rebellion against the Separatists on Onderon during the Clone Wars, and was killed by a droid gunship during the final battle while risking her life to save King Dendup. Her death deeply affected her brother.

The character has been voiced by Dawn-Lyen Gardner in The Clone Wars.

Moff Gideon

The Grand Inquisitor

Commander CC-1004 "Gree" 
CC-1004, or "Gree", is a clone Commander of the 41st Elite Corps, serving under Jedi Luminara Unduli during the Clone Wars. In Revenge of the Sith, he takes part in the Battle of Kashyyyk and attempts to carry out Order 66 by executing Yoda, but the Jedi Master senses his intentions and swiftly decapitates him and another trooper.

The character has been voiced by Temuera Morrison in Episode III, and voiced by Dee Bradley Baker in The Clone Wars.

Greedo

Captain CC-5576-39 "Gregor" 
CC-5576-39, or "Gregor", is a clone Commando thought to have died in the Battle of Sarrish. Stricken with amnesia and living on Abafar, he is later told by Colonel Meebur Gascon that he is a clone trooper, and seemingly sacrifices himself to help the Colonel and his droids to get off Abafar to save many Republic lives. However, he survives this ordeal and eventually returns to the Republic, after which he removes his biochip, so that he would not be forced to carry out Order 66. When the Republic is reorganized into the Empire after the end of the Clone Wars, Gregor is forced to train conscripted Imperial soldiers, until the Bad Batch rescue him. Years later, Gregor ends up in the Seelos system with fellow retired clones Rex and Wolffe, and is shown to have developed some eccentric tendencies. He aids a group of rebels against Imperial forces in a skirmish on the planet, and later takes part in a battle to free the planet Lothal from Imperial occupation, though he is fatally wounded by an Imperial technician during the battle.

The character has been voiced by Dee Bradley Baker in The Clone Wars, Rebels, and The Bad Batch.

Grievous

Grogu / The Child

Nute Gunray 
Nute Gunray is the Neimoidian Viceroy of the Trade Federation whose invasion of Naboo is supported by Darth Sidious during the events of The Phantom Menace, his animosity towards Padmé Amidala leading him to join the Separatist Alliance as one of its high-ranking members in Attack of the Clones. In Revenge of the Sith, following Count Dooku's death, Gunray was sent with the other Separatist Council leaders to Mustafar by General Grievous where they are eventually executed by Darth Vader.

The character has been portrayed by Silas Carson in Episodes I-III, and voiced by Tom Kenny in The Clone Wars.

H

Rune Haako 
Rune Haamo is Nute Gunray's right-hand man. He is a high-ranking member of the Trade Federation the Separatist Council. He is killed along with the other Separatist leaders on Mustafar by Darth Vader.

The character has been portrayed by Jerome Blake and James Taylor (voice) in Episode I, by Alan Ruscoe and Chris Truswell (voice) in Episode II, and by Sandy Thompson in Episode III.

Valin Hess 
Valin Hess is an Imperial officer who used to have Migs Mayfeld as a soldier. He encounters Mayfield again when he and the Mandalorian infiltrate an Imperial rhydonium refinery on Morak to discover Moff Gideon's whereabouts and is killed by his former soldier just as he recognizes him because he insulted the soldiers killed during Operation: Cinder.

The character has been portrayed by Richard Brake in The Mandalorian.

Amilyn Holdo

"Hunter" 
Sergeant "Hunter" is a deformed clone trooper and commander of Clone Force 99. He has genetic mutations that give him enhanced senses, such as tracking and feeling electromagnetic signals. During Order 66, after witnessing Jedi Master Depa Billaba's death, he lets her Padawan, Caleb Dume, escape. After the formation of the Empire, Hunter along with most of Clone Force 99 rebel and become mercenaries.

The character has been voiced by Dee Bradley Baker in The Clone Wars and The Bad Batch.

Armitage Hux

I

Chirrut Îmwe 
Chirrut Îmwe is a blind warrior who believes in the Force and is said to be one of the Guardians of the Whills. He aids the Rebel Alliance in stealing the plans for the Death Star in Rogue One, and he is killed during the Battle of Scarif.

The character has been portrayed by Donnie Yen in Rogue One.

J

Jabba the Hutt

Jannah 
Jannah is a former First Order stormtrooper originally designated as TZ-1719 who joins the Resistance and befriends Finn.

The character has been portrayed by Naomi Ackie in Episode IX.

CT-5597 "Jesse" 
CT-5597, or "Jesse", is an ARC Trooper within the 501st Legion who fights in many battles throughout the Clone Wars. During the Siege of Mandalore, he is captured by Darth Maul to be used as bait in luring Ahsoka Tano to him, but is eventually rescued. When Order 66 is issued, Jesse is among the clones to attempt to execute Ahsoka, as well as Rex after he has his chip removed and sides with her. Along with all the other troopers aboard, Jesse is killed when the Venator-class Star Destroyer Tribunal they are on crashes on a small moon, and is buried by Ahsoka and Rex.

The character has been voiced by Dee Bradley Baker in The Clone Wars and Tales of the Jedi.

Dexter Jettster 
Dexter Jettster is the Besalisk owner of Dex's Diner, and an old friend of Obi-Wan Kenobi, who provides Kenobi with information regarding the planet Kamino.

The character has been voiced by Ronald Falk in Episode II.

Tiaan Jerjerrod 
Moff Tiaan Jerjerrod is the commanding officer of the second Death Star. Jerjerrod is tasked by Darth Vader to hurry the completion of the second Death Star and warned that the Emperor is not as forgiving as Vader.

The character has been portrayed by Michael Pennington in Episode VI.

Qui-Gon Jinn

Cere Junda 
Cere Junda is a former Jedi Knight who trained Trilla Suduri, survivor of Order 66, and the co-pilot of the Stinger Mantis. She becomes the mentor figure and master for Cal Kestis, while trying to escape her troubled past and resume her own role as a Jedi.

The character has been voiced by Debra Wilson in Jedi: Fallen Order and Jedi: Survivor.

K

Alexsandr Kallus 
Agent Alexsandr Kallus is a former member of the Imperial Security Bureau who led the efforts to suppress an uprising on the planet Lothal and developed a rivalry with Zeb Orrelios because Kallus took part in the attacks that wiped out much of his kind. He eventually begins to question his morality and loyalty to the Empire after he and Zeb are forced to work together to survive upon being stranded on a remote planet. By the time Thrawn is promoted to Grand Admiral, Kallus has become a spy for the Rebel Alliance, and fully defects once his treason is discovered. Kallus plays a major role in the liberation of Lothal from Imperial occupation, and ends up befriending Zeb.

The character has been voiced by David Oyelowo in Rebels.

Maz Kanata

Greef Karga

Syril Karn 
Syril Karn is a Deputy Inspector for Preox-Morlana (Pre-Mor) Authority, a corporate conglomerate in charge of a trade sector. Karn works for Pre-Mor’s security services and is determined to capture Andor after he is suspected of murdering two Pre-Mor security employees. 

The character has been portrayed by Kyle Soller in Andor. Soller described his character as having "an extreme sense of need to impress, and fill a hole in himself. And so that really is about ascending to the top of whatever field he’s in. The field he’s chosen is one of restriction and complete control, and one of domination."

Kassius Konstantine 
Admiral Kassius Konstantine is an Imperial Navy officer who assists the Inquisitors, Darth Vader, and Grand Admiral Thrawn in pursuing the Rebels. He is killed during the Battle of Atollon.

The character has been voiced by Dee Bradley Baker in Rebels.

Katuunko 
Katuunko is the Toydarian monarch who aids the Republic during the Clone Wars; killed by Savage Oppress after the Battle of Sullust.

The character has been voiced by Brian George in The Clone Wars.

Obi-Wan Kenobi / Ben Kenobi

Cal Kestis

Agen Kolar 
Agen Kolar is an Iridonian Zabrak Jedi Master and member of the Jedi Council. He is one of the Jedi killed while trying to arrest Darth Sidious.

The character has been portrayed by Tux Akindoyeni in Episodes II-III.

Plo Koon 
Plo Koon is a Kel Dor Jedi Master and Jedi Council member in the prequel trilogy. He discovered Ahsoka Tano on her homeworld, Shili, and participated in many battles during the Clone Wars. He is killed when his Jedi starfighter is shot down at Cato Neimoidia by his own military escort (a squadron of ARC-170 starfighters led by Captain Jag) as part of Order 66.

The character has been portrayed by Alan Ruscoe in Episode I, by Matt Sloan in Episodes II-III, and voiced by James Arnold Taylor in The Clone Wars.

Eeth Koth 
Eeth Koth is an Iridonian Zabrak Jedi Master and member of the Jedi Council. He was removed from the Jedi Council at the end of the Clone Wars and intended on leaving the Order, but Order 66 was issued before he could do so. Surviving, he goes into hiding and starts a family, but is eventually tracked down and killed by Darth Vader.

The character has been portrayed by Hassani Shapi in Episode I, and voiced by Chris Edgerly in The Clone Wars.

Pong Krell 
Pong Krell is a Besalisk Jedi who serves as a temporary commander of the 501st Legion during the Battle of Umbara in the Clone Wars. He hates clones and has secret aspirations to be Count Dooku's new apprentice, but is executed by the trooper Dogma after his treachery becomes known. His distinct anatomy allows him to wield two double-bladed lightsabers.

The character has been voiced by Dave Fennoy in The Clone Wars.

Orson Krennic

Marg Krim 
Marg Krim is a high-ranking member of the Pyke Syndicate who succeeds Lom Pyke as minister after his death in the Clone Wars. He remains a loyal lieutenant of Darth Maul until the end of the Clone Wars, when he is ordered to go into hiding.

The character has been voiced by Stephen Stanton in The Clone Wars.

Black Krrsantan

Bo-Katan Kryze

Satine Kryze 
Satine Kryze is the Duchess of Mandalore, sister of Bo-Katan, and romantic interest of Obi-Wan Kenobi. A pacifist leader, she tries not to get involved in the Clone Wars, and forms the Council of Neutral Systems, much to the disgust of the Death Watch, who try to assassinate and replace her numerous times throughout the war, but all their attempts are thwarted by the Jedi, particularly Kenobi. The Jedi Master had previously protected Satine in her youth, and the two formed a close bond, with Kenobi claiming that he would have left the Jedi Order a long time ago had Satine asked. Satine later watches her world fall to the Shadow Collective, under Darth Maul, who ultimately murders her in front of a captured Kenobi.

The character has been voiced by Anna Graves in The Clone Wars.

Kuiil

L

Beru Whitesun Lars 
Beru Lars is the step-aunt and surrogate mother of Luke Skywalker. She and her husband Owen are killed by stormtroopers at their home on Tatooine.

The character has been portrayed by Shelagh Fraser in Episode IV, and by Bonnie Piesse in Episodes II-III and Obi-Wan Kenobi.

Cliegg Lars 
Cliegg Lars is a moisture farmer who purchases, then frees and marries, Shmi Skywalker, becoming the stepfather of Anakin Skywalker, whom he meets only briefly. He loses his leg when pursuing the Sand People who had kidnapped Shmi.

The character has been portrayed by Jack Thompson in Episode II. The name Cliegg, and variations of it, have been in Star Wars drafts since 1974.

Owen Lars 
Owen Lars is the step-uncle and surrogate father of Luke Skywalker. Owen and his wife, Beru, are killed by stormtroopers at their home on Tatooine.

The character has been portrayed by Phil Brown in Episode IV, and by Joel Edgerton in Episodes II-III and Obi-Wan Kenobi.

Cut Lawquane 
Cut Lawquane is a former clone trooper who deserted the army to live a quiet life as a farmer on Saleucami. He has a wife Suu and two children, Jek and Shaeeah. During the Clone Wars, he meets Captain Rex, and the pair eventually come to trust one another after working together to defend Cut's family from Commando Droids, with Rex deciding not to report Cut. After the formation of the Galactic Empire, Cut and his family, with help from the Bad Batch, leave Saleucami due to increased military presence on the planet.

The character has been voiced by Dee Bradley Baker in The Clone Wars and The Bad Batch.

Zare Leonis 
Zare Leonis is a cadet at the Imperial Academy, where his sister Dhara disappeared due to apparent Force-sensitivity. He stays in the academy as a spy in order to find her, as well as to feed information to the rebels, until he is himself taken by the Grand Inquisitor.

The character has been voiced by Bryton James in Rebels.

Lobot 
Lobot is Lando Calrissian's cyborg aide in The Empire Strikes Back. He has a cybernetic implant that allows him to interface directly with Cloud City's central computer.

The character has been portrayed by John Hollis in Episode V.

Kino Loy 
Kino Loy is a floor manager at the Imperial factory facility on the planet Narkina 5. 

The character has been portrayed by Andy Serkis in Andor. Serkis previously portrayed Supreme Leader Snoke in the sequel trilogy.

M

Crix Madine 
Crix Madine is a Rebel general who comes up with the plan of destroying the shield generator for the second Death Star.

The character has been portrayed by Dermot Crowley in Episode VI.

Baze Malbus 
Baze Malbus is a mercenary and friend of Chirrut Îmwe who aids the Rebel Alliance in stealing the plans for the Death Star in Rogue One. He is killed during the Battle of Scarif.

The character has been portrayed by Jiang Wen in Rogue One

Taron Malicos 
Taron Malicos is a Jedi Master who fought in the Clone Wars and survived Order 66. Left stranded on Dathomir for years, he eventually succumbed to the dark side and sought to learn the Nightsisters' magic by manipulating Nightsister Merrin. He attempts to lure Cal Kestis to the dark side, but Kestis defeats him with Merrin's help, who buries him alive.

The character has been voiced by Liam McIntyre in Jedi: Fallen Order.

Ody Mandrell 
Ody Mandrell is an Er'Kit Podracer from Tatooine. During the Boonta Eve Classic, one of Mandrell's Pit-droids gets sucked into the engine of his Podracer, preventing it from racing.

Rafa and Trace Martez 
Rafa Martez, a smuggler, and Trace Martez, a pilot and mechanic, are sisters from Coruscant who uses a hangar and a laundromatand as fronts for her illegal affairs. After their parents were killed and the Jedi did little to nothing to help them, the sisters became embittered against the Order, and sought to make enough money to leave Coruscant. Near the end of the Clone Wars, the sisters befriend Ahsoka Tano, who helps them when a job to deliver spice to the Pyke Syndicate falls through, leading to Rafa and Trace changing their views of the Jedi. Shortly after the rise of the Galactic Empire, the sisters are hired by Captain Rex to retrieve data from a tactical droid on Corellia, where they have a run-in with the Bad Batch, looking for the same data. In the end, the Bad Batch give the data to Rafa and Trace after learning they want to use it to fight the Empire.

Rafa Martez has been voiced by Elizabeth Rodriguez, and Trace Martez has been voiced by Brigitte Kali, both appearing in The Clone Wars and The Bad Batch.

Darth Maul

Migs Mayfeld

Mart Mattin 
Mart Mattin is a young human Rebel pilot who was in Hera Syndulla's fighter squad during their ultimately ill-fated attack on Lothal City's Imperial base. He is the only other Rebel pilot besides Hera and Chopper to survive the battle and escape captivity, and is later retrieved to join the Lothal Rebel cell in their guerilla fight against the Empire, implementing a secret plan devised by Ezra Bridger to bring in a pod of Purrgil against Admiral Thrawn's fleet.

The character has been voiced by Zachary Gordon in Rebels.

Dedra Meero 
Dedra Meero is a supervisor for the Imperial Security Bureau who takes a particular interest into the actions of Cassian Andor and the growing rebellion.

The character has been portrayed by Denise Gough in Andor.

Ruescott Melshi 

Ruescott Melshi was a sergeant in the Alliance to Restore the Republic Special Forces during the early years of the Galactic Civil War. He was also a prisoner on Narkina 5 and escaped with Cassian Andor.

The character has been portrayed by Duncan Pow in Rogue One and in Andor.

Sly Moore 
Sly Moore is an Umbaran personal aide of Palpatine and one of the few people aware of his identity as Darth Sidious.

The character has been portrayed by Sandi Findlay in Episodes II-III.

Mon Mothma 

Mon Mothma is a Republic senator, and co-founder and leader of the Rebel Alliance. Later serves as Chancellor of the New Republic and is a major influence in relocating the galactic capital from Coruscant to Hosnian Prime following the Empire's defeat.

The character has been portrayed by Caroline Blakiston in Episode VI, voiced by Kath Soucie in The Clone Wars, and portrayed by Genevieve O'Reilly in Episode III, Rebels, Rogue One, and Andor.

Peli Motto 
Peli Motto is a docking bay attendant and ship mechanic working at Mos Eisley who is visited several times by the Mandalorian, befriending him and Grogu.

The character has been portrayed by Amy Sedaris in The Mandalorian and The Book of Boba Fett.

Ki-Adi-Mundi 
Ki-Adi-Mundi is a Cerean Jedi Master and Jedi Council member in the prequel trilogy. He is one of the leaders of the Jedi strike force sent to rescue Obi-Wan Kenobi, Anakin Skywalker, and Padmé Amidala on Geonosis, and a Jedi General during the Clone Wars. At the end of the Clone Wars, he leads his clone troopers in the Battle of Mygeeto, and is killed as a result of Order 66.

The character has been portrayed by Silas Carson in Episodes I-III, and voiced by Brian George in The Clone Wars and Tales of the Jedi.

N

Rugor Nass 
Boss Rugor Nass is a Gungan leader who first established a treaty with the Naboo humans, and he later attends Padmé Amidala's funeral.

The character has been voiced by Brian Blessed in Episode I.

Enfys Nest 
Enfys Nest is the leader of a gang of pirates called the Cloud Riders, who are revealed to be supporters of the nascent Rebel Alliance.

The character has been portrayed by Erin Kellyman in Solo.

99 "Ninety-Nine" 
"99" is a deformed clone trooper who helps the Domino Squad during the Clone Wars. He is killed during one of the battles of Kamino. He is the namesake of Clone Force 99.

The character has been voiced by Dee Bradley Baker in The Clone Wars.

Jocasta Nu 
Jocasta Nu is a Jedi librarian featured in the prequel trilogy. She survives Order 66, but is later killed by Darth Vader.

The character has been portrayed by Alethea McGrath in Episode II, and voiced by Flo Di Re in The Clone Wars and Tales of the Jedi.

Nien Nunb

O

Commander CC-2237 "Odd Ball" 
CC-2237, or "Odd Ball", is a clone Commander and pilot, who participates in several battles throughout the Clone Wars under the command of Obi-Wan Kenobi, such as the Battle of Teth, the Battle of Umbara, the Battle of Coruscant, and the Battle of Utapau. A skilled pilot, Odd Ball flies an assortment of starfighters, including the V-19 Torrent and the ARC-170.

The character has been voiced by Temuera Morrison in Episode III, and voiced by Dee Bradley Baker in The Clone Wars.

Barriss Offee 
Barriss Offee is a Mirialan Jedi apprentice of Luminara Unduli and a close friend of Ahsoka Tano. She later betrays Ahsoka and frames her for a terrorist bombing after she becomes disillusioned with the Jedi Order's wartime policies. Offee is eventually unmasked and defeated by Anakin Skywalker, resulting in her arrest.

The character has been portrayed by Nalini Krishan in Episode II, and voiced by Meredith Salenger in The Clone Wars.

Hondo Ohnaka 
Hondo Ohnaka is the leader of the space pirates known as the Ohnaka Gang which kidnaps and attempts to ransom Obi-Wan Kenobi, Anakin Skywalker, Count Dooku—and later Ahsoka Tano—to the highest bidder during the Clone Wars. He follows a code of honor and respects the Jedi, whom he ends up helping several times in the war, but is not above using sneaky tactics and treachery if it is for "good business". Years after the Clone Wars, despite losing his crew to the Galactic Empire, Hondo continues his criminal activities while having dealings with the crew of the Ghost.

The character has been voiced by Jim Cummings in The Clone Wars, Rebels, and Forces of Destiny.

Ric Olié 
Pilot who flies the queen's ship while escaping Naboo and an N-1 starfighter as leader of Bravo Squadron.

The character has been portrayed by Ralph Brown in Episode I.

Omega 
Omega is a young female clone who served as Nale Se's medical assistant on Kamino, until joining Clone Force 99 to escape from the planet after their betrayal of the Empire. She is later revealed to be an unaltered clone of Jango Fett, similar to Boba Fett.

The character has been voiced by Michelle Ang in The Bad Batch.

Ketsu Onyo 
Ketsu Onyo is a Mandalorian bounty hunter and former estranged friend of Sabine Wren. She and Sabine were cadets at the Imperial Academy, later escaping and becoming bounty hunting partners before Ketsu left Sabine for dead and began working for the Black Sun. After they reconcile, Ketsu aids the Rebel Alliance.

The character has been voiced by Gina Torres in Rebels and Forces of Destiny.

Oola 
Oola is a Twi'lek dancer enslaved by Jabba the Hutt and chained to his throne; she is killed by Jabba's Rancor.

The character has been portrayed by Femi Taylor in Episode VI. New scenes featuring the character were filmed for the Special Edition of Return of the Jedi.

Savage Opress 
Savage Opress is a Dathomirian Zabrak Nightbrother, and the brother of Darth Maul. He is hand picked by Asajj Ventress as part of her scheme to kill Count Dooku for the attempt on her life and is altered by the Nightsisters, becoming more of a berserker on Ventress' call to the point of killing Feral, (his adoptive brother), without remorse, Opress manages to become Dooku's new apprentice and learns only a bit in the ways of the Sith before Ventress has him help her fight Dooku, due to his actions under him getting unwanted attention from the Jedi. However, in the heat of the moment and provoked by both of them, Opress tries to kill both Dooku and Ventress before escaping the Jedi and instructed by Mother Talzin to find Maul so he can complete his training to defend himself against the numerous enemies he has made. Finding Maul a shell of his former self on a junk planet, Opress manages to stir up his fellow nightbrother's grudge with Obi-Wan to aid him in his revenge against the Jedi. He is later killed in a duel by Darth Sidious on Mandalore.

The character has been voiced by Clancy Brown in The Clone Wars.

Bail Organa 
Bail Organa is Leia Organa's adoptive father, a Senator of Alderaan and one of the Rebel Alliance's founding members. He adopts Leia after her birth mother, Padmé, dies and her birth father, Anakin Skywalker, turns to the dark side. Bail is killed in the destruction of Alderaan by the Death Star. 

The character has been portrayed by Jimmy Smits in Episodes II-III, Rogue One, and Obi-Wan Kenobi, and voiced by Phil LaMarr in The Clone Wars, Rebels, Tales of the Jedi and The Bad Batch. He first appeared in Attack of the Clones, portrayed by Jimmy Smits, though he appeared in scenes cut from The Phantom Menace, where he was portrayed by Adrian Dunbar, with Dunbar's character retconned into a separate character named Bail Antilles.

Breha Organa 
Breha Organa is Queen of Alderaan, wife of Bail Organa, and adoptive mother of Leia Organa. She is killed in the destruction of Alderaan.

The character has been portrayed by Rebecca Jackson Mendoza in Episode III, and by Simone Kessell in Obi-Wan Kenobi. Breha is also featured in the short story "Eclipse" and in the 2017 novel Leia, Princess of Alderaan.

Leia Organa

Garazeb "Zeb" Orrelios 
Garazeb "Zeb" Orrelios is the former Captain of the Lasat high honor guard who rose up against the Empire, which led to the near-extinction of his people. He is the muscle of the Ghost crew, serving under call sign Spectre 4. The genocide campaign against his people left him with a gruff demeanor, as well as leading him into conflict with Agent Kallus, though eventually Kallus defects from the Empire to join the Alliance as a Rebel spy.

The character has been voiced by Steve Blum in Rebels. The physical appearance of the Lasat species is based on Ralph McQuarrie's original conceptual artwork for Chewbacca. Art director Kilian Plunkett said: "Zeb actually is very articulate and witty and funny, and that's sort of juxtaposed with what he looks like, makes for an interesting character".

P

Sheev Palpatine / Darth Sidious

Quarsh Panaka 
Quarsh Panaka is the captain of the Queen Amidala's guard in The Phantom Menace. 

The character has been portrayed by Hugh Quarshie in Episode I. In the novel Leia, Princess of Alderaan, he meets a young Leia Organa, but is subsequently assassinated by Saw Gerrera and his Partisans.

Baron Papanoida 
Baron Papanoida is a Pantoran Senator and Chairman of the Pantoran Assembly.

The character has been portrayed by George Lucas in Episode III, and voiced by Corey Burton in The Clone Wars.

Doctor Pershing 
Pershing is an Imperial Doctor working for Moff Gideon who experiments on Grogu, but does not want to harm him.

The character has been portrayed by Omid Abtahi in The Mandalorian.

Captain Phasma

Even Piell 
Even Piell is a Lannik Jedi Master and Council Member. During the Clone Wars, he participated in a mission regarding the Nexus Route, a key hyperspace lane discovered in the Outer Rim. Piell was captured, imprisoned, and tortured in the prison known as the Citadel, along with Wilhuff Tarkin, who held the other half of the secret information. A rescue mission was sent, but Piell was killed by local wolf-like anoobas just after giving Ahsoka Tano his piece of the information.

The character has been portrayed by Michaela Cottrel in Episode I, and voiced by Bair Bless in The Clone Wars.

Firmus Piett

Unkar Plutt 
Unkar Plutt is a Crolute Junkboss on the planet Jakku who pays out portions of food in exchange for pieces of salvage. He attempts to bargain the droid BB-8 from Rey and then tries to steal it when she refuses, but Rey ends up fleeing the planet by stealing the Millennium Falcon from him.

The character has been portrayed by Simon Pegg in Episode VII, and voiced by Dee Bradley Baker in Forces of Destiny.

Poggle the Lesser 
Poggle the Lesser is the Archduke of Geonosis, part of the Techno Union and one of the Separatist leaders killed by Darth Vader on Mustafar. Poggle controls the Geonosian battle droid factories and commands the droid army that fought in the two battles of Geonosis. He also assists in the early planning and construction of the first Death Star.

The character has been voiced by Marton Csokas in Episode II, and voiced by Matthew Wood in The Clone Wars.

Commander CT-411 "Ponds" 
CT-411, or "Ponds", is a Clone Commander who serves Mace Windu in the Clone Wars. He helps organize clone commando units on Geonosis and fights on Ryloth and Malastare in later battles. He is eventually captured by a group of bounty hunters and executed by Aurra Sing in an attempt to lure Windu into a trap.

The character has been voiced by Temuera Morrison in Episode II, and voiced by Dee Bradley Baker in The Clone Wars.

Yarael Poof 
Yarael Poof is a Quermian Jedi Master on the Jedi High Council.

The character has been portrayed by Michelle Taylor in Episode I.

Jek Porkins 
Jek Porkins is a portly X-wing pilot codenamed "Red Six" who is killed in the attack on the first Death Star.

The character has been portrayed by William Hootkins in Episode IV. Porkins has gained some comedic notoriety due to his size, manner and untimely death, which was spoofed in the Family Guy episode Blue Harvest.

Arihnda Pryce 
Arihnda Pryce is the Imperial Governor of Lothal.

The character has been voiced by Mary Elizabeth McGlynn in Rebels. Her backstory is explored in the novel Star Wars: Thrawn.

Enric Pryde 
Enric Pryde is a former Imperial Admiral who rose to prominence as Allegiant General of the First Order during Kylo Ren's reign. He develops a rivalry with General Hux, whom he eventually executes after discovering his treason, and later is put in charge of the Sith Eternal's fleet, the Final Order, during the Battle of Exegol, where he dies when his Resurgent-class Star Destroyer Steadfast is destroyed by the Resistance.

The character has been portrayed by Richard E. Grant in Episode IX.

Lom Pyke 
Lom Pyke is Minister of the Pyke Syndicate during the Clone Wars who joins the Shadow Collective and participates in the attack on Sundari with his criminal allies. When the Jedi Council later investigate the disappearance of Sifo-Dyas, Obi-Wan Kenobi and Anakin Skywalker are sent to Oba Diah to confront the Pykes. Lom is forced to tell the truth behind the death of Sifo-Dyas to the Jedi, as well as the Pykes' involvement, though he offers his prisoner Silman in return for amnesty. When Count Dooku learns of this, he arrives on Oba Diah and kills Lom.

The character has been voiced by Matt Lanter in The Clone Wars.

Q

Qi'ra

Quarrie 
Quarrie (voiced by Corey Burton) is a Mon Calamari engineer living on the planet Shantipole. He built the prototype B-wing, the Blade Wing, which was gifted to Hera in "Wings of the Master", and later oversaw the secret construction of more B-wings for the Rebel Alliance at Senator Organa's request.

The character has been voiced by Corey Burton in Rebels. He is named after Star Wars concept artist Ralph McQuarrie.

R

Raddus 
Raddus is a green-skinned Mon Calamari admiral of the Rebel Alliance that perishes during the Battle of Scarif. He serves as the namesake of the Resistance MC85 Star Cruiser known as the Raddus.

The character has been portrayed by Paul Kasey and voiced by Stephen Stanton in Rogue One.

Luthen Rael 
Luthen Rael is a part of the Rebel Alliance who hires Cassian on his first mission as a Rebel operative. Publicly, Luthen poses as an eccentric antiques dealer from Coruscant.

The character has been portrayed by Stellan Skarsgård in Andor.

Dak Ralter 
Dak Ralter is Luke Skywalker's snowspeeder gunner who dies in the Battle of Hoth when their snow speeder is damaged by an Imperial Walker.

The character has been portrayed by John Morton in Episode V.

Oppo Rancisis 
Oppo Rancisis is a Thisspiasian Jedi Master and Jedi Council member.

The character has been portrayed by Jerome Blake in Episode I.

Fenn Rau
Fenn Rau is the leader of the Protectors of Concord Dawn, part of the elite Protectors organization who guard the royal family of Mandalore. A veteran of the Clone Wars, he accepted Imperial bribes to prevent rebel travel through his system, but later ordered his men to permit rebel passage to keep the Empire away after being captured by Sabine. He later sided with the Rebellion after his men were slaughtered by the Imperial Super Commandos and eventually joined Clan Wren in the Mandalorian Civil War.

The character has been voiced by Kevin McKidd in Rebels.

Max Rebo 
Max Rebo is an Ortolan keyboard player and leader of the Max Rebo Band.

The character has been portrayed by Simon Williamson in Episode VI, as well as making a cameo appearance in The Book of Boba Fett.

Ren

Captain CT-7567 "Rex"

Rey

Nossor Ri 
Nossor Ri was the chieftain of the Quarren and lead the Quarren Isolation League. Ri conspired with the CIS to attack the Mon Calamari during the Clone Wars. He eventually realized his mistake and betrayed the CIS. Decades later he sacrificed his life to help the Resistance escape the First Order attack on Mon Cala.

The character has been voiced by Corey Burton in The Clone Wars.

Bodhi Rook

Roshti 
Roshti is Governor of the planet Kiros and leader of a colony of 50,000 Togruta during the Clone Wars.

The character has been voiced by Corey Burton in The Clone Wars.

Rukh 
Rukh is a Noghri assassin who serves as an agent and tracker under Grand Admiral Thrawn. He has a keen sense of smell which he uses to track down victims, and he wields an electrostaff. He first tracks the Spectres after they try to escape with vital information about the TIE Defender, and he captures Hera Syndulla after the Rebel Alliance's failed attack on the Lothal TIE factory. Rukh battles Kanan during Hera's escape, and after getting knocked off the roof, tracks the escapees. He battles both Zeb and Sabine, but is defeated and nearly beaten to death by Zeb until Sabine stops him and sends him back unconscious and covered in paint by Sabine to the city as a living message to the Imperial forces. Rukh is later killed after Zeb traps him in an generator during the final battle on Lothal.

The character has been voiced by Warwick Davis in Rebels. Rukh originally appeared in the Star Wars Legends Thrawn novel trilogy, where he is Thrawn's bodyguard who ultimately turns against and kills Thrawn.

S

Sabé 
Sabé is one of Padmé Amidala's handmaidens. Sabé is the queen's decoy; for parts of the movie, the Sabé character is addressed as Amidala. 

The character has been portrayed by Keira Knightley in Episode I. Knightley was cast as Sabé due to her resemblance to Natalie Portman, who portrayed Amidala.

Vel Sartha 
Vel Sartha is a Rebel leader on the planet Aldhani, and cousin of Mon Mothma.

In 2023, the character was portrayed by Faye Marsay in Andor.

Jun Sato 
Jun Sato is the commander of the rebel cell Phoenix Squadron, which the Ghost crew joins. He is also the uncle of Rebel pilot Mart Mattin. He sacrifices himself during the Battle of Atollon in order for Ezra Bridger to get reinforcements.

The character has been voiced by Keone Young in Rebels.

Gar Saxon 
Gar Saxon is a Mandalorian warrior who serves under Darth Maul. Alongside Rook Kast, he aids Maul's escape from Darth Sidious and commands his forces during the Siege of Mandalore, until Maul betrays them and allows them to be captured by the Republic in order to make his own escape. Following the Galactic Empire's takeover of Mandalore, Saxon becomes Imperial Viceroy and Governor, wiping out the protectors, but is ultimately defeated by Sabine Wren and killed by Ursa Wren.

The character has been voiced by Ray Stevenson in The Clone Wars and Rebels.

Tiber Saxon 
Tiber Saxon is Gar Saxon's brother, appointed Imperial Governor of Mandalore and leader of the Super Commandos after his brother was killed by Clan Wren. To put down the Mandalorian rebellion, he ordered the construction of a weapon known as an Arc Pulse Generator, code-named the "Duchess" (after the late Duchess Satine Kryze), developed by Sabine Wren when she was a cadet at the Imperial Academy on Mandalore. The weapon specifically targeted the alloy used in Mandalorian armor and superheated it, vaporizing the wearer. However, as Sabine had destroyed the plans and damaged the prototype when she defected, the weapon was not at its full potential; Grand Admiral Thrawn ordered the new Governor Saxon to capture Sabine to perfect the weapon. Imprisoned aboard Saxon's Imperial I-class Star Destroyer in the Mandalorian capital, Sabine altered the weapon to affect the alloys in Imperial armor, before breaching its core with the Darksaber and escaping. The explosion vaporized the Star Destroyer, killing Saxon and those of his men still on board.

The character has been voiced by Tobias Menzies in Rebels.

Nala Se 
Nala Se is a Kaminoan scientist in charge of the cloning process. She cares for her medical assistant, a young female clone named Omega, and helps her and Clone Force 99 escape from Kamino after they betray the Empire.

The character has been voiced by Gwendoline Yeo in The Clone Wars and The Bad Batch.

Sebulba 
Sebulba is a Dug podracer who competes against Anakin Skywalker. He is very arrogant and competitive, and will resort to any means to achieve victory, even cheating. Once a slave, Sebulba's podracing skills bought his freedom.

The character has been voiced by Lewis MacLeod in Episode I.

Aayla Secura 
Aayla Secura is a Twi'lek Jedi. She is one of the thousands of Jedi to fall victim of Order 66, getting betrayed and killed by her own clone troopers on Felucia. Aayla also appears as a disembodied voice empowering Rey to face the revived Darth Sidious.

The character has been portrayed by Amy Allen in Episodes II-III, and voiced by Jennifer Hale in The Clone Wars and Episode IX.

Zev Senesca 
Zev Senesca is a member of the Rebel Alliance and Rogue Squadron pilot, designated as "Rogue Two", Senesca pilots a snowspeeder and dies during the Battle of Hoth in combat against the Imperial AT-AT walkers. He is also the pilot who locates Han Solo and Luke Skywalker, who are stranded in the snow away from the Rebel base on Hoth.

The character has been portrayed by Christopher Malcolm in Episode V.

Reva Sevander / Third Sister 
Reva Sevander is a ruthless, ambitious Inquisitor who survived Order 66 as a Jedi Youngling. She takes special interest in hunting down Obi-Wan Kenobi among other surviving Jedi, blaming him for Anakin Skywalker's turn to the Dark Side to become Darth Vader. Secretly, she plans to use her position to assassinate Vader for killing her Youngling friends, but she fails and is stabbed by Vader, revealing that her treachery was already suspected. She survives and tries to avenge Vader by killing his son, Luke, but she redeems herself and reconciles with Kenobi.

The character has been portrayed by Moses Ingram in Obi-Wan Kenobi.

The Seventh Sister 
The Seventh Sister is a Mirialan Inquisitor introduced in the second season of Rebels, who uses mini probe droids to track her targets. After the Grand Inquisitor's death, she and the Fifth Brother are tasked with hunting the Ghost crew. They are both ultimately killed by Maul on Malachor.

The character has been voiced by Sarah Michelle Gellar in Rebels.

Fennec Shand

Aurra Sing 
Aurra Sing is a Palliduvan bounty hunter from Nar Shaddaa. She once had a romantic relationship with Hondo Ohnaka and became a mother figure to a young Boba Fett. She was killed by Tobias Beckett at some point after the Clone Wars.

The character has been portrayed by Michonne Bourriague in Episode I, and voiced by Jaime King in The Clone Wars.

Tera Sinube 
Tera Sinube is an elderly Cosian Jedi Master who wielded a white lightsaber based on a cane sword. Sinube spent most of his time studying in the Jedi Temple Archives, and formed a friendship with Ahsoka Tano while helping her recover her stolen lightsaber. After the rise of the Empire, Sinube's body was discovered by Obi-Wan Kenobi in the Fortress Inquisitorius, preserved in amber, and likely meaning he survived Order 66 before being killed by Inquisitors.

The character has been voiced by Greg Baldwin in The Clone Wars.

The Sixth Brother 
The Sixth Brother is an Inquisitor of unknown species and origin, sent to hunt down and kill the rogue Jedi Ahsoka Tano after her escape from Order 66 based on the tip of a local villager who observed her using the Force. The Sixth Brother slaughters most of the community, and he is eventually killed by Tano after a quick duel.

The character has been voiced by Clancy Brown in Tales of the Jedi.

Anakin Skywalker / Darth Vader

Luke Skywalker

Shmi Skywalker 
Shmi Skywalker is the mother of Anakin Skywalker, and Luke and Leia's paternal grandmother. Qui-Gon Jinn attempts to bargain for her freedom from slavery but fails. Shmi encourages Anakin to leave Tatooine with Qui-Gon to seek his destiny, but Anakin finds it hard to leave without her. A widowed moisture farmer named Cliegg Lars later falls in love with Shmi, and after he purchases her freedom from Watto, they marry. Shmi dies in Anakin's arms after being kidnapped and tortured by Tusken Raiders.

The character has been portrayed by Pernilla August in Episodes I-II and The Clone Wars.

Snoke

Sy Snootles 
Sy Snootles is a female Pa'lowick and lead vocalist of the Max Rebo Band. During the Clone Wars, she is Ziro the Hutt's lover, but works as a spy for the Hutt Clan and eventually kills him.

The character has been performed by puppeteers Tim Rose and Mike Quinn in Episode VI, and voiced by Annie Arbogast in Episode VI, and voiced by Nika Futterman in The Clone Wars.

Osi Sobek 
Osi Sobek is a Phindian CIS commander who serves as the warden of the prison known as "The Citadel" on the planet Lola Sayu. He is killed by Ahsoka Tano during a mission to break out Jedi Master Even Piell.

The character has been voiced by James Arnold Taylor in The Clone Wars.

Ben Solo / Kylo Ren

Han Solo

The Son 
One of the Mortis gods, the Son is the embodiment of the dark side of the Force, child of the Father, and brother to the Daughter. Unlike his sister, he is often disobedient to their father and secretly wishes to kill him so that he could escape from Mortis. To this ends, he corrupts Ahsoka Tano with his dark influence, and attempts to seduce Anakin Skywalker, whom the Father believed to be the Chosen One and a possible successor, to the dark side, which he briefly succeeds in doing by showing him visions of his future, until the Father erases those visions from Anakin's mind. While attempting to kill the Father, the Son accidentally kills his sister and, though devastated, does not stop from trying to achieve his goal. Realizing this, the Father commits suicide to render the Son mortal, who finally reconciles with him before Anakin kills him.

The character has been voiced by Sam Witwer in The Clone Wars.

Lama Su 
Lama Su is the Prime Minister of Kamino. During the Clone Wars, he is revealed to be in the employ of Darth Tyranus as part of the scheme to have the clones eliminate the Jedi.

The character has been voiced by Anthony Phelan in Episode II, and by Bob Bergen in The Clone Wars and The Bad Batch.

Trilla Suduri / The Second Sister 
Trilla Suduri is an Inquisitor and former Jedi Padawan of Cere Junda, who was captured and tortured by the Empire after Cere betrayed her location under intense interrogation. She is assigned to hunt down Cal Kestis and retrieve a Holocron containing a list of Force-sensitive children. She is later killed by Darth Vader for her failure.

The character has been voiced by Elizabeth Grullon in Jedi: Fallen Order. The Second Sister also makes a cameo appearance in the comic series Darth Vader: Dark Lord of the Sith.

Cham Syndulla 
Cham Syndulla is a Twi'lek freedom fighter who opposes the Separatists independently before allying with the Republic Army when the Clone Wars come to Ryloth. In the aftermath of the Clone Wars, Cham opposes the newly established Galactic Empire's occupation of his world and becomes distanced from his daughter Hera after the death of her mother due to his single-minded determination to liberate Ryloth at any cost. The pair are later reconciled after Cham and his warriors Gobi and Numa team up with Hera's crew to steal an Imperial carrier and shoot down an Imperial cruiser over Ryloth.

The character has been voiced by Robin Atkin Downes in The Clone Wars, Rebels, and The Bad Batch.

Hera Syndulla 
Hera Syndulla is a Twi'lek female, and the daughter of Cham Syndulla, who leaves her homeworld Ryloth to fight the Empire as a member of the rebel crew of the Ghost. She is the mother-figure of the Ghost crew, and holds the group together when they would otherwise fall apart. She shares a strong connection with Kanan Jarrus, with whom she has a son, Jacen Syndulla, before Jarrus' death on Lothal. An outstanding pilot, Hera served as call sign Spectre 2 with the crew of the Ghost, and she was later promoted to Captain of the Phoenix Squadron in the Rebel Alliance.

The character has been voiced by Vanessa Marshall in Rebels, Forces of Destiny, and The Bad Batch. The character will appear in Ahsoka, and she has also appeared in a notable role in the game Star Wars: Squadrons.

T

Orn Free Taa 
Orn Free Taa is a Twi'lek who represents Ryloth in the Galactic Senate during the prequel trilogy.

The character has been portrayed by Jerome Blake in Episode I, by Matt Rowan in Episodes II-III, and voiced by Phil LaMarr in The Clone Wars and The Bad Batch.

Mother Talzin 
Mother Talzin is the Dathomirian leader of the Nightsister clans before and during the Clone Wars, and the biological mother of Maul, Savage Oppress, and Feral. She possesses great magical powers, ranging from mind control, manipulating matter, and turning into mist. Following General Grievous' attack on Dathomir, she is one of the few surviving Nightsisters. Later, Talzin manipulates a cult into stealing the living Force within other beings and collect it in an orb for her. When enough is collected, Talzin intends to absorb the Force and gain great strength beyond any other Jedi or Sith. However, she is defeated by the combined efforts of Mace Windu and Jar Jar Binks. 

The character has been voiced by Barbara Goodson in The Clone Wars.

Wat Tambor 
Wat Tambor is the Skakoan Foreman of the Techno Union and Executive of Baktoid Armor Workshop before and during the Clone Wars. He serves on the Separatist Council during the Clone Wars and helps to fund and supply the Confederacy of Independent Systems. He is one of the Separatist leaders killed by Darth Vader on Mustafar.

The character has been voiced by Chris Truswell in Episode II, and voiced by Matthew Wood in The Clone Wars.

Ahsoka Tano / Fulcrum

Wilhuff Tarkin

Tarfful 
Tarfful is a Wookiee chieftain who, along with Chewbacca, commands the Wookiee warriors during the Battle of Kashyyyk, and later helps Yoda escape the clone troopers after Order 66 is given.

The character has been portrayed by Michael Kingma in Episode III. He also appears in the video game Star Wars Jedi: Fallen Order.

Roos Tarpals 
Roos Tarpals is a Gungan General. He is killed in a fight with General Grievous.

The character has been voiced by Steve Speirs in Episode I, and voiced by Fred Tatasciore in The Clone Wars.

Jaro Tapal 
Jaro Tapal is a Lasat Jedi Master who trained Cal Kestis and sacrificed himself to help him escape during Order 66. Tapal's death haunted Cal for years, who blamed himself for what happened, but he eventually found the strength to forgive himself.

The character has been voiced by Travis Willingham in Jedi: Fallen Order.

"Tech" 
"Tech" is a deformed clone trooper and member of Clone Force 99. He is the team's brains, having genetic mutations that make him more intelligent and skilled with technology than other clones. Following Order 66, Tech along with most of the team rebel against the Empire and become mercenaries.

The character has been voiced by Dee Bradley Baker in The Clone Wars and The Bad Batch.

Lor San Tekka 
Lor San Tekka is a former explorer and a devout follower of the Church of the Force, as well as an old ally of Luke Skywalker, living on the planet Jakku. He gives Poe Dameron a fragment of the map needed to find Luke, and is subsequently executed by Kylo Ren.

The character has been portrayed by Max von Sydow in Episode VII.

Carson Teva 
Carson Teva is Captain in the New Republic's Starfighter Corps from Alderaan who rescues the Mandalorian from a swarm of ice spiders on Maldo Kreis, and later offers Greef Karga the chance to help the New Republic defeat the Empire.

The character has been portrayed by Paul Sun-Hyung Lee in The Mandalorian and The Book of Boba Fett.

Thrawn

Shaak Ti 
Shaak Ti is a Togruta Jedi Master and member of the Jedi Council. She is killed by Darth Vader at the Jedi Temple on Coruscant during Order 66.

The character has been portrayed by Orli Shoshan in Episodes II-III, and voiced by Tasia Valenza in The Clone Wars.

Rose Tico

Saesee Tiin 
Saesee Tinn is an Iktotchi Jedi Master and member of the Jedi High Council. He is one of the four Jedi Masters who die trying to arrest Darth Sidious. He uses a green lightsaber.

The character has been portrayed by Khan Bonfils in Episode I, by Jesse Jensen in Episode II, by Kenji Oates in Episode III, and voiced by Dee Bradley Baker in The Clone Wars.

Meena Tills 
Meena Tills is the senator of the Calamari Sector.

The character has been voiced by Anna Graves in The Clone Wars.

Trench 
Trench is the Harch Admiral of the Separatist Navy who commands the blockade of the planet Christophsis. He is one of the most skilled military tacticians at the time and supposedly has a history of being able to track cloaked ships. He seemingly dies early in the Clone Wars, but later reemerges with cybernetics covering nearly half of his body. Trench is finally killed by Anakin Skywalker.

The character has been voiced by Dee Bradley Baker in The Clone Wars.

CC-5385 "Tup" 

CC-5385, or "Tup", is a rookie clone trooper who has a teardrop tattoo on his face, and matching designs on his helmet. He participates in the Battle of Umbara, and was key to the capture of rogue Jedi General Pong Krell. During his time in the campaign on Ringo Vinda, Tup's biochip malfunctions, leading him to carry out Order 66 earlier than intended. As Tup was being shipped back to Kamino for evaluation, he was kidnapped by the Separatists but recovered shortly afterwards. He dies of medical complications on Kamino during the ensuing investigation.

The character has been voiced by Dee Bradley Baker in The Clone Wars.

Gregar Typho 
Gregar Typho is the nephew of Captain Panaka, and Amidala's bodyguard.

The character has been portrayed by Jay Laga'aia in Episodes II-III, and voiced by James Mathis III in The Clone Wars.

U

Luminara Unduli 
Luminara Unduli is a Mirialan Jedi Master in the prequel trilogy and Barriss Offee's mentor. She is killed as a result of Order 66. Luminara's body was used to lure Rebels and surviving Jedi into a trap, under the guise that she was still alive. Luminara later appears as a disembodied voice empowering Rey to face the revived Darth Sidious.

The character has been portrayed by Mary Oyaya in Episode II, Fay David in Episode III, and voiced by Cree Summer in The Clone Wars, and by Olivia d'Abo in The Clone Wars and Episode IX.

V

Finis Valorum 
Finis Valorum is the Supreme Chancellor of the Galactic Republic, who is ousted from office, allowing Palpatine to rise to power.

The character has been portrayed by Terence Stamp in Episode I, and voiced by Ian Ruskin in The Clone Wars. Finis valorum is Late Latin for "the end of values". According to performer Terence Stamp, the character was intended by George Lucas to be based on then-President of the United States Bill Clinton as a "good but beleaguered man," although Stamp noted that this had been before the Clinton impeachment trial. Valorum's name stems from the original drafts of The Star Wars, in which it belonged to a character combined with Vader, then Vader's master, before being phased out of the original trilogy.

Cobb Vanth

Maximilian Veers 
General Maximilian Veers is commander of the 501st Legion who leads the Empire's attack on Hoth, commanding the lead AT-AT Imperial Walker.

The character has been portrayed by Julian Glover in Episode V.

Asajj Ventress

Iden Versio

Cikatro Vizago 
Cikatro Vizago is a Devaronian crime lord who the Ghost crew occasionally runs errands and smuggles goods for in exchange for credits and information. He later aids the Ghost crew in getting past the Imperial blockade of Lothal, but is found out, sold as a slave to the Mining Guild and made to operate an ore crawler skimming Lothal's surface for minerals. After being freed by Ezra's team, he joins the Lothal rebels, and assists the Ghost crew in the final battle against Governor Pryce and Grand Admiral Thrawn.

The character has been voiced by Keith Szarabajka in Rebels.

Paz Vizsla

Pre Vizsla 
Pre Vizsla is a Mandalorian warrior and the leader of the Death Watch during the Clone Wars, wielding the Darksaber which belonged to his ancestor Tor Vizsla. Formerly the Governor of Concordia, one of Mandalore's moons, he secretly sides with Count Dooku during the Clone Wars and longs to restore the warrior heritage of Mandalore by overthrowing its pacifist government led by Duchess Satine. His many attempts to do so fail and he eventually breaks ties with Dooku. Vizsla later allies himself with Darth Maul and Savage Opress, and together they recruit the Black Sun, Pyke Syndicate, and Hutt Clan to form a criminal alliance known as the Shadow Collective. After Vizsla ousts Duchess Satine with the help of the collective, he betrays his allies (except the Death Watch) and has them imprisoned. Maul escapes and challenges Vizla to a duel to determine who shall rule Mandalore. Vizsla accepts, but is ultimately no match for the Sith Lord, who executes him and takes over Mandalore and the Death Watch.

The character has been voiced by Jon Favreau in The Clone Wars.

Dryden Vos 
Dryden Vos is a near-human crime lord who serves as the figurehead of the Crimson Dawn crime syndicate, led from the shadows by Darth Maul, and has history with Tobias Beckett, whom he recruited to steal coaxium for him. He is killed and replaced by his top lieutenant, Qi'ra.

The character has been portrayed by Paul Bettany in Solo. Vos also briefly appears as a hologram in the final season of The Clone Wars, which establishes him as a lieutenant of Maul from during the Clone Wars.

Quinlan Vos 
Quinlan Vos is a Kiffar Jedi Master in The Clone Wars, and the master of Jedi Aayla Secura. He teams up with (and falls in love with) Asajj Ventress in an attempt to assassinate Count Dooku, but ends up turning to the dark side. He is eventually redeemed with Ventress's help, who sacrifices herself to save him. Vos later respectfully buries her on her homeworld, Dathomir, and is reinstated into the Jedi Order. He is one of the few known survivors of Order 66.

The character has been voiced by Al Rodrigo in The Clone Wars. The character's design was based on a background extra from the Tatooine set in The Phantom Menace, and this extra was retroactively made Vos on a secret mission for the Jedi Council.

W

Wicket W. Warrick

Watto

Taun We 
Taun We is a Kaminoan administrator who guides Obi-Wan Kenobi during his visit to the cloning facility. Following the rise of the Empire, she is killed by Fennec Shand.

The character has been voiced by Rena Owen in Episode II and The Bad Batch. During filming, Owen wore a maquette of the alien's head atop a hardhat, providing her co-stars with the proper eye-line for talking with the character.

Zam Wesell 
Zam Wesell is a Clawdite bounty hunter hired by Jango Fett to kill Padmé Amidala. She fails in her mission and is killed with a poison dart by Fett before she could reveal his involvement.

The character has been portrayed by Leeanna Walsman in Episode II.

Temmin "Snap" Wexley 
Temmin "Snap" Wexley is a Resistance X-wing fighter pilot, and he dies during the Battle of Exegol. He is the son of wayward Rebel pilot Norra Wexley.

The character has been portrayed by Greg Grunberg in Episode VII and IX. He is also a major character in the Star Wars: Poe Dameron comic series, as well as the Aftermath trilogy as a resourceful teenager.

Mace Windu

Commander CC-3636 "Wolffe" 
CC-3636, or "Wolffe", is a clone Commander of the 104th Battalion and leader of the "Wolfpack", serving under Jedi Plo Koon during the Clone Wars. During the war, he gained a large scar on his right eye. He is one of the few clones to have removed his inhibitor chip and, as such, was not forced to carry out Order 66. During the Galactic Empire era, he ends up in the Seelos system with fellow clones Rex and Gregor, and later helps the Rebels free Lothal from Imperial occupation.

The character has been voiced by Dee Bradley Baker in The Clone Wars and Rebels.

"Wrecker" 
"Wrecker" is a deformed clone trooper and member of Clone Force 99. He is the team's muscles, having genetic mutations that make him much larger and stronger than other clone troopers. Following Order 66, Wrecker along with most of the team rebel against the Empire and become mercenaries. Though Wrecker's biochip is later activated and he briefly turns on his squadmates, they manage to remove it from his brain, restoring his free will.

The character has been voiced by Dee Bradley Baker in The Clone Wars and The Bad Batch.

Sabine Wren 
Sabine Wren is a sixteen-year-old Mandalorian graffiti artist, Imperial Academy dropout, former bounty hunter, and the weapons expert of the crew of the Ghost, serving under call sign Spectre 5. She maintains all of the crew's weapons (apart from lightsabers), often modifying and upgrading them. Wren also designs explosive gadgets and is skilled both in electrical and vehicle engineering. She wears a heavily-modified Mandalorian armor. Wren is an artist, who paints almost everything owned by her in her unique style. Her works inspired the symbol of the rebellion. As a Mandalorian, Wren is a skilled warrior and strategist. Originally a dedicated student of the Empire, and a prodigy of sorts, she deserted after one of the weapons she designed was used against her own people. Wren is related to House Vizsla, leading her to acquire the Darksaber after Maul fled Mandalore. She is trained in combat by Kanan Jarrus, and she uses the saber to unite her people, before granting the weapon to Bo-Katan Kryze.

The character has been voiced by Tiya Sircar in Rebels and Forces of Destiny, and the character will be portrayed by Natasha Liu Bordizzo in Ahsoka. For Rebels, CG supervisor of lighting and FX Joel Aron said, "She's adding something that we haven't really seen before in the Star Wars universe. You have a character that is expressively creative through art—whether it's the color of her hair or what she's done to her armor."

Sabine's parents are Alrich and Ursa Wren, voiced by Cary-Hiroyuki Tagawa and Sharmila Devar in Rebels. Her younger brother is Tristan, voiced by Ritesh Rajan in Rebels.

X

Xi'an 
Xi'an is a Twi'lek member of Ranzar Malk's crew, who is skilled in fighting with a knife, the sister of Qin, and an old associate and former lover of the Mandalorian. After her brother is captured and imprisoned aboard a New Republic transport, the crew tries to rescue with the help of the Mandalorian. Xi'an and the others secretly planned to abandon the Mandalorian once they released Qin, but he outsmarts and defeats them, resulting in their arrest.

The character has been portrayed by Natalia Tena in The Mandalorian.

Y

Yaddle 
Yaddle is a female member of Yoda's species who appears as a member of the Jedi Council. She is killed attempting to stop Dooku from turning to the dark side.

The character has been portrayed by Phil Eason in Episode I, and voiced by Bryce Dallas Howard in Star Wars: Tales of the Jedi. She was created from a concept art by Iain McCaig for a young Yoda.

Yoda

Wullf Yularen 
Wullf Yularen is an Imperial officer on the first Death Star. During the Clone Wars, Yularen served as an admiral in the Republic Navy, and a leader of Anakin Skywalker's fleet. He is later promoted to colonel and also the leader of the Imperial Security Bureau. He was killed in the destruction of the Death Star.

The character has been portrayed by Robert Clarke in Episode IV, voiced by Tom Kane in The Clone Wars and Rebels, and portrayed by Malcolm Sinclair in Andor.

Z

Ziro the Hutt 
Ziro is a Galactic Basic-speaking Hutt crime lord, Jabba the Hutt's flamboyant uncle, and Mama the Hutt's son, who secretly plots to overthrow the Hutt Clan and usurp all their power. During the Clone Wars, he makes a secret plan with Count Dooku to have Jabba's son captured by Assajj Ventress and blame the Jedi for the incident, but their scheme fails, as Jabba's son is rescued by Anakin Skywalker and Ahsoka Tano, and Ziro is discovered and arrested by Padmé Amidala. While in prison, he hires Aurra Sing to assassinate Amidala, but she fails. Later, fearing that Ziro will give the Republic the Hutt Council's records that he had hidden away, Jabba hires Cad Bane and a team of bounty hunters to break him out of prison, with them taking several Senators hostage in exchange for Ziro's release. Ziro then meets with the rest of the Hutt Clan on Nal Hutta, but refuses to tell them where he had hidden the records and, thus, is imprisoned. He is broken out by his lover, Sy Snootles, shortly after, and the two of them head over to Mama the Hutt's house on Teth, where the records are located. However, Snootles betrays Ziro and reveals that she was hired by Jabba to find the records, before killing him.

The character has been voiced by Corey Burton in The Clone Wars.

Zuckuss 
Zuckuss is a Gand bounty hunter among those who answer Darth Vader's call to capture the Millennium Falcon. He is a skilled tracker, and often works alongside the droid 4-LOM. 

The character has been portrayed by Cathy Munroe in Episode V. The action figure of the character released in Kenner's original Star Wars action figure line was misidentified as his droid colleague "4-LOM".

See also 
 Lists of Star Wars cast members
 List of Star Wars creatures
 List of Star Wars droid characters
 List of Star Wars Legends characters
 List of Star Wars: Knights of the Old Republic characters
 List of Star Wars books

References

 
Star Wars
Characters
Star Wars